Loris Mouyokolo (born 22 May 2001) is a French professional footballer who plays as a defender for  club Rodez on loan from Lorient.

Career 
Loris Mouyokolo is a youth product of the FC Lorient academy, having joined the Bretons aged only 7.

Having played a few friendly games with the Merlus in the 2020 summer, he signed his first professional contract with the club on 16 November 2020.

Mouyokolo made his professional debut for Lorient on 16 December 2020 in a Ligue 1 game against PSG. He came on as a substitute of Thomas Fontaine in at the 73rd, as Lorient had already seen their central defender Andreaw Gravillon sent out, and were losing 2–0 at the Parc des Princes, the score not changing after Mouyokolo's entry.

On 24 January 2022, Mouyokolo joined Bourg-Péronnas on loan.

On 9 August 2022, Mouyokolo was loaned to Rodez in Ligue 2.

Personal life
Born in France, Mouyokolo is of Congolese descent.

References

External links

2001 births
Living people
People from Drancy
French footballers
French sportspeople of Republic of the Congo descent
Association football defenders
FC Lorient players
Football Bourg-en-Bresse Péronnas 01 players
Rodez AF players
Ligue 1 players
Ligue 2 players
Championnat National 2 players
Championnat National players
Black French sportspeople